Ken Austin may refer to:

 Ken Austin (cricketer) (1908–2004), Rhodesian cricketer
 Ken Austin (inventor) (born 1957), chairman of Inview Technology Ltd
 Ken Austin (basketball) (born 1961), American basketball player
 Ken Austin (politician) (1915–1986), Australian politician
 Kenneth Darrell Austin (born 1951), former professional American football offensive lineman

See also
Kenneth Austen (born 1941), British armed robber and prison breaker